Mark Ruzzin is the former mayor of Boulder, Colorado.  Ruzzin was first elected to the Boulder City Council in November 2001 and re-elected in November 2003. He was appointed mayor by the city council in September 2004 and reappointed in November 2005.  As of 2008, he works full-time for ICLEI-Local Governments for Sustainability as the Western Regional Director.

External links
Biography by the City of Boulder
Biography by the Southwest Energy Efficiency Project

Year of birth missing (living people)
Living people
Mayors of Boulder, Colorado
Colorado city council members